Karnataka State Highway 69 (KA SH 69), is a state highway that runs through Haveri and Uttara Kannada, district in the Indian state of Karnataka. This state highway touches numerous cities like Sirsi, Mundgod, and Tadas.

References

Roads in Haveri district
Roads in Uttara Kannada district